Colostethus furviventris is a species of frog in the family Dendrobatidae. It is endemic to Colombia. Its natural habitats are subtropical or tropical moist montane forests and rivers.

References

Colostethus
Amphibians of Colombia
Taxa named by Juan A. Rivero
Taxa named by Marco Antonio Serna Díaz
Amphibians described in 1991
Taxonomy articles created by Polbot